Haggerleases railway station, also known as Butterknowle railway station, served the village of Butterknowle, County Durham, England, in 1859 on the Haggerleases Branch.

History 
The station was opened in April 1859 by the Stockton and Darlington Railway, although there is evidence of it being used earlier by horse-drawn coaches. This ended in 1847. It was served by one train per day in May 1859 but this was increased to two trains per day in June. It was a very short-lived station, closing in August 1859.

References 

Disused railway stations in County Durham
Railway stations in Great Britain opened in 1859
Railway stations in Great Britain closed in 1859
1859 establishments in England
1859 disestablishments in England